WTRI (1520 kHz) is a commercial AM radio station licensed to Brunswick, Maryland, serving Southern Frederick County, Maryland and Northern Loudoun County, Virginia.  WTRI is owned by Hasmukh Shah and airs a South Asian format of Bollywood music and talk in Hindi and Punjabi.

WTRI is a daytimer, required to go off the air at sunset because AM 1520 is a clear channel frequency, reserved for Class A WWKB in Buffalo, New York, and KOKC in Oklahoma City.

By day, WTRI broadcasts with 17,000 watts from a tower off 13th Avenue in Brunswick.  Programming is also heard on an FM translator station, 101.7 W269DH in Leesburg, Virginia.

History
WTRI first signed on the air on October 2, 1966.  It aired a country music format and transmitted with 250 watts, required to go off the air at sunset.

WTRI was owned by the Lyndon LaRouche organization based in nearby Leesburg, Virginia, from 1986 to 1991.  The LaRouche organization sold the failing station and it switched to a local music format in 1992.

On October 1, 2007, WTRI flipped to brokered Spanish language programming.  The station's former "Vegas Radio" adult standards format was abandoned at that time.

As of March 3, 2009, WTRI was effectively dark, though no silent transmission application was filed with the Federal Communications Commission.  On April 8, 2009, WTRI began carrying a Classic Country format under the branding "Radio Earl."

In January 2010, the "Radio Earl" format was abandoned in favor of leasing the station's signal to nearby WTHU, a Christian talk and teaching AM radio station.  In September 2010, the station ceased operations, and after October 2010, was off the air.

In January 2011, WTRI began broadcasting Spanish language music as "Radio La Grande 1520."  On May 18, 2011 WTRI began carrying "KHZ Network" with eclectic pop music also carried on Maryland stations WKHZ, WYRE and WAMD (AM).  In September 2011, the station again went silent.

In May 2012, WTRI began relaying the South Asian programming from "Radio Asia" based in New Jersey.  As of March 3, 2013, the station was again silent.

In May 2014, after repeated fines for going silent without permission, the station fell into receivership by order of the Federal Communications Commission.  WTRI was off the air and in receivership until it was bought for $275,000 in May 2015 by Hasmukh Shah, who also owns WXMC in New Jersey.

Shah began broadcasting the "Radio Asia" format on WTRI, airing a variety of Filmi and Bollywood music, along with talk in Hindi and Punjabi. The purchase was consummated on August 6, 2015, at a price of $275,000.

Translator
In addition to the main station, WTRI is relayed by one translator.

References

External links

TRI
Frederick County, Maryland
Radio stations established in 1966
1966 establishments in Maryland
TRI